Interferon-γ release assays (IGRA) are medical tests used in the diagnosis of some infectious diseases, especially tuberculosis.  Interferon-γ (IFN-γ) release assays rely on the fact that T-lymphocytes will release IFN-γ when exposed to specific antigens.  These tests are mostly developed for the field of tuberculosis diagnosis, but in theory, may be used in the diagnosis of other diseases which rely on cell-mediated immunity, e.g. cytomegalovirus and leishmaniasis.  For example, in patients with cutaneous adverse drug reactions, challenge of peripheral blood lymphocytes with the drug causing the reaction produced a positive test result for half of the drugs tested.

There are currently two IFN-γ release assays available for the diagnosis of tuberculosis:
 QuantiFERON-TB Gold (licensed in US, Europe and Japan); and
 T-SPOT.TB, a form of ELISpot, the variant of ELISA (licensed in Europe, US, Japan and China).

The former test quantitates the amount of IFN-γ produced in response to the ESAT-6 and CFP-10 antigens from Mycobacterium tuberculosis, which are distinguishable from those present in BCG and most other non-tuberculous mycobacteria.  The latter test determines the total number of individual effector T cells expressing IFN-γ.

The indications for the test are still disputed.  It has been evaluated for the diagnosis of latent tuberculosis in HIV patients (who frequently have a negative Mantoux test).

References

Tuberculosis